Teniente FAP Jaime Montreuil Morales Airport  is an airport serving Chimbote, in the Ancash Region of Peru. It is operated by the civil government and handles many government planes.

Airlines and destinations 

As of December 2022, there are no regularly scheduled passenger flights.

Former Destinations

See also

Transport in Peru
List of airports in Peru

References

External links
SkyVector Aeronautical Charts
OurAirports - Chimbote

Airports in Peru
Buildings and structures in Ancash Region